Daniel Hand High School is a four-year comprehensive public high school in Madison, Connecticut, United States. It serves grades 9 through 12 and is the only high school in Madison Public Schools.

History
Businessman Daniel Hand, a native of Madison, funded construction of a high school for the city in 1884 at the price of $15,000 and relinquished property ownership to the local government. Under the name of Hand Academy, it served the city until 1921, when the building was torn down and a schoolhouse for all grades was built. That school lasted forty years until Madison Public Schools constructed a purpose-built high school in 1961 and named it Daniel Hand High School.

Athletics
Daniel Hand athletic teams are nicknamed the Tigers and compete in the Southern Connecticut Conference.

* denotes a co-championship

Performing arts
DHHS has a competitive mixed-gender show choir, "VIBE", and previously fielded the all-female "Aura". VIBE has won regional-level championships before, and is regarded as one of the most consistently successful choirs in New England. The program also hosts an annual competition, the Connecticut Classic, which has drawn choirs from as far as Mississippi.

Notable alumni
Jack Driscoll, NFL player for the Philadelphia Eagles
Chris Flanagan, broadcaster in the Washington Television market
Joe Trapani, basketball player
Streeter Seidell, head writer for Saturday Night Live and formerly CollegeHumor

References

External links 
 

Madison, Connecticut
Schools in New Haven County, Connecticut
Public high schools in Connecticut
Educational institutions established in 1884
1884 establishments in Connecticut